Mashhad railway station (Persian: ايستگاه راه آهن مشهد, Istgah-e Rah Ahan-e Mashhad) is located in Mashhad, Razavi Khorasan, the second largest city of Iran. The station is owned by IRI Railways, and was designed by Heydar Ghiai.

Design and Opening
Mashhad railway station was opened by Pahlavi II and his Shahbanoo Sorayya Esfandiari on May 2, 1957, with the arrival of the royal train.
Since Khorasan is the land of Ashkanians and Parthians and Mashhad is close to the original capital of them (Parten Nesa), this structure was designed inspired by Parthian architecture (Hatra Palace).

The station has an elongated plan with two rows of oval concrete columns on two axes, and a wavy roof is mounted on them. There are two wide side columns inside the space. The result of this design was an open and integrated interior space, which the sequence of columns, the contrast of concrete and glass, and how the light enters from inside, added to the splendor and sense of peace of the space. Upon entering, this building greets the travelers with a suspended and huge ceiling, and then passing through an array of columns, it reaches a hall with a high arch, which creates greatness in the viewer's mind.

Mashhad railway station has been the most prominent building belonging to contemporary architectural trends in Mashhad.

Symbol

The crown symbol in front of the station is refer to Afsharian's hat and Nader's crown. It was design by Yaghoob Danesh Doost

Park

Railroad Square and Boulevard is one of the greenest and most beautiful parks and recreation areas in Mashhad. In 2017, during the Taghizade Khamesi municipality period, with the aim of redefining and transforming it into an urban arena space (plaza) and using the potential of the lower levels of the area, it was put on the agenda of Mashhad urban management, and the symbol of the sq. returned to its original form.

Connections

The three crossings of Mashhad Railway Square are:
 Hashminejad Street (former Foozia) leading to Koohsangi,
 Behjat St. (former Hospital Alley, Shah Reza, Azadi) leading to Sina Hospital and Central Post Office,
 Razavi Street (former Beyhaghghi) leading to Razavi Shrine.

The streets and boulevard around the Mashhad railway are:
 The railway boulevard (currently  Blvd.) is a wide and green boulevard that has a park line and a long recreational space,
 Ebadi St. (former Nader Kalat Road and Khaaje Rabi),
 Ommat  Blvd. ,
 Majlesi Blvd.

Also, Tabarsi St. has been crossed through the railway area as an underpass.

Service summary
Note: Classifications are unofficial and only to best reflect the type of service offered on each path
Meaning of Classifications:
Local Service: Services originating from a major city, and running outwards, with stops at all stations
Regional Service: Services connecting two major centres, with stops at almost all stations
InterRegio Service: Services connecting two major centres, with stops at major and some minor stations
InterRegio-Express Service:Services connecting two major centres, with stops at major stations
InterCity Service: Services connecting two (or more) major centres, with no stops in between, with the sole purpose of connecting said centres.

References

External links

Railway stations in Iran
Buildings and structures in Mashhad
Heydar Ghiai buildings and structures